Entekhab (Persian: انتخاب; Choice) was a Persian language newspaper published in Iran between 1991 and 2004. Nevertheless, its news website is active under the name of "Entekhab" (Entekhab.ir) and has turned into one of the most  highly visited news websites in Iran, close to reformists.

History
Entekhab was founded by Mohammad Mahdi Faghihi, who was previously the founder of the respected philosophical quarterly, Naghd va Nazar. The daily had a moderate stance and its editorials were mostly educated in Qom's seminary, but their new insights on Entekhab shook the political scene in Iran during the late 1990s.

Khamenei ordered the paper to close down shortly after its start. Although it was reopened later, the paper was banned in 2004.

The paper still operates an online version and it is one of the most popular news websites, with a focus on foreign policy and domestic affairs. Entekhab is among the reformist news sites in favour of restoring the ties with the US and enhancing the relationships with China simultaneously.

In 2009 presidential election, Entekhab was one of the leading pro-Mousavi news websites, leading to its closure for more than eight months following the massive protests occurring over the disputed results of the race.

Criticizing the governments' approaches, Entekhab, which is managed by Mostafa Faghihi, a senior media adviser to the late Akbar Hashemi Rafsanjani, has been ordered to be banned for more than 16 times by the governments of hardline Mahmoud Ahmadinejad and moderate Hassan Rouhani. The news website, however, has managed to survive and gain much influence in Iranian politics.

As the chief editor, Mostafa Faghihi has repeatedly faced charges and sentenced to prison. He was lately found guilty for "insulting the Supreme Leader", and was also summoned to the court over his scoop and breaking the news about the real number of deaths from Corona virus in Iran.

َAkbar Hashemi Rafsanjani, Iran's two time president, has praised Entekhab for its performance, saying the outlet has succeeded in "attracting many audience and achieving a desirable level of influence."

See also

List of newspapers in Iran

References

External links
Official website

1991 establishments in Iran
2004 disestablishments in Iran
Publications established in 1991
Publications disestablished in 2004
Defunct newspapers published in Iran
Iranian news websites
Persian-language newspapers